Domenico Valvassori, O.S.A. (5 August 1627 – 2 October 1689) was a Roman Catholic prelate who served as Bishop of Gravina di Puglia (1686–1689).

Biography
Domenico Valvassori was born in Trezzo, Italy on 5 August 1627 and ordained a priest in the Order of Saint Augustine. On 18 March 1686, he was appointed during the papacy of Pope Innocent XI as Bishop of Gravina di Puglia. On 25 March 1686, he was consecrated bishop by Alessandro Crescenzi (cardinal), Cardinal Priest of Santa Prisca, with Giuseppe Eusanio, Titular Bishop of Porphyreon, and Pier Antonio Capobianco, Bishop Emeritus of Lacedonia, serving as co-consecrators. He served as Bishop of Gravina di Puglia until his death on 2 October 1689.

References

External links and additional sources
 (for Chronology of Bishops) 
 (for Chronology of Bishops) 

17th-century Italian Roman Catholic bishops
Bishops appointed by Pope Innocent XI
1627 births
1689 deaths